Nieuwerkerk aan den IJssel is a railway station in Nieuwerkerk aan den IJssel, Netherlands. The station is located on the Utrecht–Rotterdam railway between Gouda and Rotterdam Centraal. It was opened on 21 May 1971 and is mostly used by commuters. The train services are operated by Nederlandse Spoorwegen.

Train services
The following services call at Nieuwerkerk a/d IJssel:
2x per hour local service (sprinter) Uitgeest - Amsterdam - Woerden - Gouda - Rotterdam
2x per hour local service (sprinter) Rotterdam - Gouda Goverwelle

External links
NS website 
Dutch Public Transport journey planner 

Railway stations in South Holland
Railway stations opened in 1971
Zuidplas
1971 establishments in the Netherlands
Railway stations in the Netherlands opened in the 20th century